Bourbeau is a French surname. Notable people with the surname include:

Allen Bourbeau (born 1965), American former ice hockey player
André Bourbeau (1936–2018), Canadian politician
Désiré Olivier Bourbeau (1834–1900), politician and merchant

French-language surnames